The Sichuan sika deer (Cervus nippon sichuanicus) is one of the many subspecies of sika deer. It was discovered in 1978 and was proven to be a distinct subspecies. It is found in the mountains of northern Sichuan and southern Gansu, which holds the largest population of Sika Deer in China. There are currently 500 individuals left in the wild, and the numbers currently seems to be stable.

Cervus
Mammals of Asia